Peter Wray (born 16 October 1937) is an Australian sports shooter. He competed in the mixed trap event at the 1976 Summer Olympics.

References

1937 births
Living people
Australian male sport shooters
Olympic shooters of Australia
Shooters at the 1976 Summer Olympics
Place of birth missing (living people)